Ramakrishna Mission Vidyalaya, Coimbatore is a group of educational institutions with 19 wings offering courses from pre-school to doctoral levels. The Vidyalaya was established in 1930 in the suburbs of Coimbatore, India, and affiliated to Ramakrishna Mission in 1934. Ramakrishna Mission's official General Reports start giving reports of its activities from 1936.

The Vidyalaya strives to infuse the educational and spiritual ideas of Sri Ramakrishna and Swami Vivekananda into the daily lives of its students. Values such as self-reliance, self-control, patriotism and dedication to duty are taught in  practical ways. A band of monks and brahmacharis of the Ramakrishna Order manage the activities of the Vidyalaya assisted by teaching and non-teaching staff.

History 
Ramakrishna Mission Vidyalaya was founded by Sri Avinashilingan chettiyar in 1930 with an investment of Rs. 5.75 and with one Harijan boy on its roll. While studying in college, Sri pani, awoke in him the vision for his future mission in the field of education. Mahatma Gandhi, the Father of the Nation, laid the foundation stone of the Vidyalaya in 1934 and wished that the students of the Vidyalaya would be intensely patriotic followers of truth. The Vidyalaya was affiliated to Ramakrishna Mission in the same year.

Campus 
Vidyalaya is located 19 km from the city of Coimbatore on the main road to Ooty. The campus is spread over nearly 300 acres of wooded land. It is home to hundreds of bird species, including peacocks.

Institutions

Colleges 
 Sri Ramakrishna Mission Vidyalaya College of Arts and Science 
 Sri Ramakrishna Mission Vidyalaya Maruthi College of Physical Education
 Sri Ramakrishna Mission Vidyalaya College of Education

Schools 
 Ramakrishna Mission Vidyalaya High School
 Sri Ramakrishna Mission Vidyalaya Swami Shivananda Higher Secondary School
 Ramakrishna Mission Vidyalaya TAT Kalanilayam Middle School

Other Institutions 
 Sri Ramakrishna Mission Vidyalaya Polytechnic College
 Sri Ramakrishna Mission Vidyalaya Gandhi Teacher Training Institute
 Ramakrishna Mission Vidyalaya Industrial Training Institute
 Sri Ramakrishna Mission Vidyalaya Agriculture Institute
 Ramakrishna Mission Vidyalaya IT Academy

Social services 
The Swami Akhandananda Rural Development Scheme started in 2002. Under this scheme, Arivoli Nagar and other rural areas are provided with tuitions and medical services.

Notable events 
Apart from technical seminars and workshops, Vidyalaya is known for the following events:

Guru Puja 
Guru puja, the public celebration of the birthday of Bhagavan Sri Ramakrishna, is the most important cultural activity of Vidyalaya and is celebrated every year on the first Sunday of January. The day-long celebration includes bhajans, talks by  personalities, drama, educational exhibition, music and cultural programmes. The highlight of the function is Maheswara Puja in which around 40,000 people are given a sumptuous feast.

Youth Convention 
Started in 2009, Youth Convention is a three-day annual event to inspire youth. The event, conducted in the first week of December, includes inspirational speeches, presentations, meditation, yoga, sports and cultural programmes.

Play Festival 
Play Festival is an annual event, in which about 4000 students from some 45 primary schools perform physical, yogic and calisthenic exercises to the rhythm of devotional and nationalistic songs. Generally conducted in February.

Kalaimagal Vizha 
Kalaimagal Vizha is a three-day event focussed on literature, music and drama. Celebrated every year in the month of September/October before Vijaya Dasami.

References

External links 
 

Universities and colleges in Coimbatore
Educational institutions established in 1930
Universities and colleges affiliated with the Ramakrishna Mission
Schools affiliated with the Ramakrishna Mission
Academic institutions formerly affiliated with the University of Madras
1930 establishments in India